is a Japanese science fiction tokusatsu television series, created by Shotaro Ishinomori and produced by Toei Company. The series premiered on Tuesday October 7, 1975, at 7:30, and ran for 38 episodes in that timeslot on NET, now known as TV Asahi. The series remains obscure outside Japan, but was popular and renowned in its home country. The series was followed by a sequel called Chojin Bibyun which used rejected designs from the Kamen Rider series as its hero designs.

Production
The program frequently alludes to the famous Alexandre Dumas, père novel The Three Musketeers.

Due to the inhuman nature of the main characters, the primary protagonists and antagonists were portrayed exclusively by stuntmen, with only their voices being portrayed by professional actors. Because of this, an unusual number of well-known voice actors star in the series, as the voices of the main characters. Makio Inoue portrays Xavitan., Kōji Yada plays Evil, and Jōji Yanami provides Gabra's gravelly intonation.

Plot summary
The program follows the adventures of three mutant superhero-refugees from the "Akuma Clan" ("Devil Clan", in English), a vast empire that exists below the surface of the Earth, and their efforts to stop the Akumas from attacking the surface world. The three warriors are Xavitan, a half-demon swordsman, Evil, a somewhat vain and foppish sharpshooter, and Gabra, a slow- and dim-witted strongman. Together, they make up the superheroic team of the show's title. At the end of the series, the heroes' bodies are destroyed, but their souls survive to be reincarnated in the direct sequel to the show, Choujin Bibyun

Characters

Akumaizer 3

 : A fencer who actually the son of an Akuma male and a human female. As a result, Xavitan leaves the Akuma Clan to defend the humans from them. Other using his Xarado blade, Xavitan can use his Xavitan Nova shoulder cannons. Though posing as Ippei, he later assumes the form of Takeshi Nagumo and works under him.
 : Member of the Discipline group sent after Xavitan. Though he captures him, Xavitan saves his life as he never killed anyone. As a result, Evil joins Xavitan. Other than his Elado blade, Evil also uses the Jo Gun and can execute the Evil Finish attack.
 : A water demon who was a member of the Discipline group sent after Xavitan. Though he loses against his target, Xavitan spares him and later saves his live. This prompts Gabra to join Xavitan. Armed with the Garado sword and Denball and chain, Gabra can remove his muscle restraints to fight at full power. He can also transform into the ostrich like Gabracho bird.

Totou Times
 Jun
 Ippei Shima
 Mitsuhiko

Allies
 Darunia
 
Basugaru
NaameNaameda
Nobera
Nobera Jr

Akuma Clan
The Akuma Clan are a race of magical cyborgs who live deep within the earth, plot to invade the surface world.

 : The Akuma Clan's leader

Episodes

Songs
Opening theme 

Lyrics: Shotaro Ishimori
Composition & Arrangement: Chumei Watanabe
Artist: Ichirô Mizuki and Koorogi '73

Ending Theme

Lyrics: Saburo Hatte
Composition & Arrangement: Chumei Watanabe
Artist: Ichirô Mizuki and Koorogi '73

Merchandise
The series was released on Region 2 DVD in October 2005. In December of the same year, a boxed set of action figures of slightly redesigned versions of the three characters was released as part of Bandai's Super Imaginative Chogokin series. Many toys and action figures have been released in connection with the series.

Cultural influence
While Akumaizer 3 has not achieved the fame or international recognition of its tokusatsu contemporaries like Kamen Rider (also created by Ishinomori) or Ultraman, it is not without cultural resonance. In the 2007 anime, Lucky Star, in which the characters sing popular songs karaoke-style, over the end credits, the character Konata sings the series' theme song in the second episode. Additionally, the main antagonists of the film Kamen Rider × Kamen Rider Wizard & Fourze: Movie War Ultimatum, the Akumaizer, are directly inspired by the heroes of the original series.

References

Footnotes

1975 Japanese television series debuts
1976 Japanese television series endings
1970s science fiction television series
Shotaro Ishinomori
Toei tokusatsu
Tokusatsu television series
TV Asahi original programming
Transforming heroes